Shadow of Chinatown is both a 1936 film serial and a feature film edited from the serial made by Sam Katzman's Victory Pictures.

Plot
A consortium of American businesses are disturbed by the loss of profits due to Chinese businesses located in Chinatowns in the United States.  They hire a pair of Eurasians and their criminal organization to eliminate their competition.

Cast
Bela Lugosi   ...  Victor Poten 
Herman Brix   ... Martin Andrews 
Joan Barclay   ... Joan Whiting 
Luana Walters   ... Sonya Rokoff,  the Dragon Lady 
Charles King   ...   Grogan
Forrest Taylor   ... Police Captain Walters

Chapter Titles
The serial chapters are as follows:
  The Arms of the Gods
  The Crushing Walls
  13 Ferguson Alley
  Death on the Wire
  The Sinister Ray
  The Sword Thrower
  The Noose
  Midnight
  The Last Warning
  The Bomb
  Thundering Doom
  Invisible Gas
  The Brink of Disaster
  The Fatal Trap
  The Avenging Powers

Production
The serial was known originally as just Chinatown and was written with Lugosi in mind.

Release
A feature version of this serial was released simultaneously with the serial itself.  It was also called "Shadow of Chinatown" and contained no new footage.

References

External links

1936 films
1936 crime films
Film serials
American black-and-white films
Films directed by Robert F. Hill
Films set in San Francisco
Films produced by Sam Katzman
American crime films
1930s English-language films
1930s American films